Godfrey  was the second recorded Archdeacon of Leicester. He was appointed by Robert, Bishop of Lincoln.

Notes

See also
 Diocese of Lincoln
 Diocese of Peterborough
 Diocese of Leicester
 Archdeacon of Leicester

Archdeacons of Leicester
12th-century English people